Claire Freeman is a New Zealand geography and urban planning academic.

Career
After a PhD at Leeds, Freeman worked at University of the North West, Leeds Metropolitan University and Massey University before moving to Otago University, where she's been a full professor since 2015

Selected works 
 Mathieu, Renaud, Claire Freeman, and Jagannath Aryal. "Mapping private gardens in urban areas using object-oriented techniques and very high-resolution satellite imagery." Landscape and Urban Planning 81, no. 3 (2007): 179–192.
 Freeman, Claire. "Local government and emerging models of participation in the Local Agenda 21 process." Journal of Environmental Planning and Management 39, no. 1 (1996): 65–78.
 Freeman, Claire, and Paul J. Tranter. Children and their urban environment: Changing worlds. Routledge, 2011.
 Freeman, Claire, and Oliver Buck. "Development of an ecological mapping methodology for urban areas in New Zealand." Landscape and Urban Planning 63, no. 3 (2003): 161–173.

References

External links
 researchgate
 institutional homepage

Living people
New Zealand women academics
Academic staff of the Massey University
Academic staff of the University of Otago
Academics of Leeds Beckett University
Alumni of the University of Leeds
Academic staff of North-West University
Year of birth missing (living people)
New Zealand women writers